RTCC may refer to:

 Real-time calendar/clock
 Real time crime center
 Russian Touring Car Championship
 Responding To Climate Change